Susan Elizabeth Tichy (born 25 April 1952, in Washington, D.C.) is an American poet.

Life
She received a B.A. from Goddard College and an M.A. from the University of Colorado, and is a Full Professor at George Mason University, where she has taught since 1988 in the MFA and undergraduate programs.
For five years she was Executive Producer of Poetry Theater: An Evening of Visual Poetics, and also served as poetry editor for the short-lived but gorgeously produced journal, "'Practice: New Writing + Art," based in the Bay area.

Her work has appeared in AGNI, Beloit Poetry Journal, Cerise Press, Colorado Review, Court Green, CutBank, Denver Quarterly, Fascicle, Free Verse, Hotel Amerika, Indiana Review, Ploughshares, 42opus, Runes, and other journals.

She also lives in the southern Colorado Rockies.

Awards
 1982 National Poetry Series, for The Hands in Exile
 Eugene Kayden Award
 National Endowment for the Arts Fellowship
 Chad Walsh Prize from Beloit Poetry Journal
 Indiana Review Prize for Poetry
 Runes Prize for Poetry
 Quarter After Eight Prize for Innovative Prose

Works
"VERSARI", Beltway Poetry Quarterly

Anthologies

References

External links
"Author's website"
"Author's university website"

1952 births
Living people
American women poets
Goddard College alumni
University of Colorado alumni
George Mason University alumni
Poets from Washington, D.C.
21st-century American women